ASH may refer to:

Medicine and health
 Action on Smoking and Health, groups publicizing the risks associated with tobacco smoking
 American Society of Hematology
 Asymmetric septal hypertrophy, an older term for hypertrophic obstructive cardiomyopathy, a heart condition
 Atascadero State Hospital, California, United States
 Austin State Hospital, Texas, United States

Transport
 National Rail code for Ash railway station, Surrey, England
 Station code for Ashburton railway station, Melbourne, Australia
 ICAO code for Mesa Airlines, a regional airline based in Phoenix, Arizona, US
 IATA code for Nashua Municipal Airport, New Hampshire, US

Other uses
 Actor's School Hiroshima, a performing arts school in Japan
American School of The Hague, a school in the Netherlands
 American Shorthair, a breed of domestic cat
 Argyll and Sutherland Highlanders, a unit of the British Army
 ASH: Archaic Sealed Heat, a 2007 Nintendo game
 Autonomous Shipboard Humanoid, a US Navy robotics project

See also
 Ash (disambiguation)